Kõpu is a village in Hiiumaa Parish, Hiiu County in northwestern Estonia.

The main sight near the village is Kõpu Lighthouse (built in 1531) that reaches 102.6 meters above sea level.

References
 

Villages in Hiiu County